South Sandy Pond, also known as South Pond, is a lake located west of Sandy Creek, New York. Fish species present in the lake are yellow perch, bluegill, northern pike, steelhead, smallmouth bass, silver bass, rock bass, largemouth bass, walleye, and black bullhead. There is access via channel from North Sandy Pond.

References

Lakes of Oswego County, New York
Lakes of New York (state)